PEN may refer to:
 (National Ecological Party), former name of the Brazilian political party Patriota (PATRI)
PEN International, worldwide association of writers
English PEN, the founding centre of PEN International
PEN America, located in New York City
PEN Center USA, part of PEN America
PEN Canada, Toronto
PEN Hong Kong
PEN-International, Postsecondary Education Network International, an international partnership of colleges for those with hearing impairment
Penang International Airport, Malaysia, IATA airport code PEN
Penarth railway station, Wales, station code PEN
Peruvian sol, ISO 4217 currency code PEN
Polyethylene naphthalate, a polyester
Private Enterprise Number, an organisation identifier
Protective earth neutral in electrical earthing systems

See also
Pen (disambiguation)
PEN/Faulkner Foundation